Game Plan (simplified Chinese: 千方百计), is a Singaporean television drama series. It stars Christopher Lee, Jesseca Liu, Jacelyn Tay and Shaun Chen as the main characters in the story. The story revolves around a complex web of lies and deceit, where truth and falsehood are ambiguous.

It was broadcast on MediaCorp Channel 8 from 9 October 2012 to 5 November 2012. A total of 20 episodes were aired during this period. It will subsequently be aired by Malaysian television channel Astro Shuang Xing from 25 October 2012 to 21 November 2012.

Episodic Synopsis

Drama Series

Webisode version
The webisode version is released the same day as Channel 8 on xinmsn, featuring deleted scenes.

References

See also
Game Plan
List of programmes broadcast by Mediacorp Channel 8

Lists of Singaporean television series episodes
Lists of soap opera episodes